The 1999–2000 VfL Bochum season was the 62nd season in club history.

Review and events
On 24 October 1999 head coach Ernst Middendorp was sacked. Bernard Dietz was appointed caretaker on 25 October 1999. Ralf Zumdick was appointed head coach on 1 January 2000.

Matches

Legend

2. Bundesliga

DFB-Pokal

Squad

Squad and statistics

Squad, appearances and goals scored

Transfers

Summer

In:

Out:

Winter

In:

Out:

VfL Bochum II

Sources

External links
 1999–2000 VfL Bochum season at Weltfussball.de 
 1999–2000 VfL Bochum season at kicker.de 
 1999–2000 VfL Bochum season at Fussballdaten.de 

Bochum
VfL Bochum seasons